Dolson is a surname. Notable people with the surname include:

Clarence Dolson (1897–1978), Canadian ice hockey player
Jeanette Dolson (1918–2004), Canadian athlete
Stefanie Dolson (born 1992), American basketball player

See also
Dotson